The Other One is a 2008 French drama film directed by Patrick Mario Bernard and Pierre Trividic, based on the novel L'Occupation by Annie Ernaux. It was an entrant at the 65th Venice International Film Festival in 2008. For her performance, Dominique Blanc won the Volpi Cup for best actress.

Cast
 Dominique Blanc as Anne-Marie
 Cyril Gueï as Alex
 Peter Bonke as Lars
 Christèle Tual as Aude
 Anne Benoît as Maryse Schneider
 Helena Noguerra as Lars's guest

References

External links

2008 films
2008 drama films
French drama films
2000s French-language films
2000s French films
Films based on autobiographical novels
Films based on French novels
Films based on works by Annie Ernaux